"I'm Not Who I Was" is a song by contemporary Christian musician Brandon Heath and was the lead single from his debut album Don't Get Comfortable (2006). It became a number 1 hit song on Christian radio in mid-2007 and was nominated for two GMA Dove Awards in 2007: "Song of the Year" and "Pop/Contemporary Recorded Song of the Year".

Content
The song is about forgiveness and, according to Brandon Heath, was inspired by seeing an old photograph of someone he hadn't been in touch with for a while.

Awards

In 2008 the song was nominated for two Dove Awards: Song of the Year and Pop/Contemporary Recorded Song of the Year at the 39th GMA Dove Awards.

Music video
The music video for the single "I'm Not Who I Was" was released on October 25, 2009. The video features Heath walking around town with a guitar in hand, performing the song.

Charts

Weekly charts

Year-end charts

References

2007 singles
Brandon Heath songs
Songs written by Brandon Heath
2005 songs